Apulo (previously called Rafael Reyes Municipality) is a Colombian town and municipality in the Cundinamarca Department.

Municipalities of Cundinamarca Department